The women's 800 metres at the 2006 European Athletics Championships were held at the Ullevi on August 7, 8 and August 10.

Klyuka was ahead with another athlete already in a medal position, but on the final bend Kotlyarova found herself boxed in. Lyne had already made a dash for home, and Kotlyarova had to push her out the way to start her sprint. Kotlyarova made a great dash and went in front of the other two Russians and an athlete from Ukraine. Lyne started sprinting and overtook the Ukrainian athlete, just pipping her into 3rd place.

Medalists

Schedule

Results

Round 1
Qualification: First 3 in each heat (Q) and the next 4 fastest (q) advance to the semifinals.

Semifinals
First 3 in each heat (Q) and the next 2 fastest (q) advance to the Final.

Final

External links
Results

800
800 metres at the European Athletics Championships
2006 in women's athletics